Art de rue is the second album by the French hip hop group Fonky Family. It was released in March 2001 and received gold certification in France.

Most titles were produced by Pone, as well as by Le Rat Luciano. Among the most prominent titles are: Mystère et suspense (produced from a sample of I Won't Hold You Back by Toto), a piece that evokes the reality of everyday life and the uncertain future of each, Art de rue (produced from a sample of Somebody's Watching Me by Rockwell) and Dans la légende, that evokes the harshness of power.

Track listing

Charts

References 

Hip hop albums by French artists
2001 albums